Justin Anthony Lawrence (born November 25, 1994) is an American professional baseball pitcher for the Colorado Rockies of Major League Baseball (MLB).

Career

Amateur career
Lawrence was born in Panama in 1994 and moved to the United States at two years old.

Lawrence attended First Coast High School in Jacksonville, Florida and played college baseball at Jacksonville University and Daytona State College. He was drafted by the Colorado Rockies in the 12th round of the 2015 Major League Baseball draft and signed.

Professional career
After signing, Lawrence made his professional debut with the Boise Hawks before being reassigned to the Grand Junction Rockies. In 22 relief appearances between the two teams, he went 0–3 with an 8.39 ERA. In 2016, he played for both Boise and the Asheville Tourists where he pitched to a 4–6 record and 4.98 ERA in 49 relief appearances, and in 2017, he returned to Asheville, going 0–2 with a 1.65 ERA in in only  innings due to injury. Lawrence spent 2018 with the Lancaster JetHawks, pitching to an 0–2 record and 2.65 ERA with 62 strikeouts in  relief innings.

After the 2018 season, Lawrence played in the Arizona Fall League. The Rockies also added him to their 40-man roster after the 2018 season. Lawrence spent the 2019 season with the Hartford Yard Goats and the Albuquerque Isotopes, going 1–5 with an 8.76 ERA, striking out 32 over 37 relief innings.

On January 17, 2020, Lawrence was suspended without pay for 80 games for testing positive for the performance enchanting substance dehydrochlormethyltestosterone. He did not play in a game in 2020 due to the cancellation of the Minor League Baseball season because of the COVID-19 pandemic.

On April 29, 2021, Lawrence was promoted to the major leagues for the first time. He made his MLB debut that day, pitching a scoreless 8th inning. In the game, he notched his first major league strikeout, punching out Arizona Diamondbacks infielder Eduardo Escobar. He posted an ERA of 8.64 in 19 games with 19 walks in  innings.

References

External links

1994 births
Living people
Albuquerque Isotopes players
Asheville Tourists players
Boise Hawks players
Colorado Rockies players
Grand Junction Rockies players
Hartford Yard Goats players
Jacksonville Dolphins baseball players
Lancaster JetHawks players
Major League Baseball pitchers
Major League Baseball players from Panama
Salt River Rafters players
2023 World Baseball Classic players